The marathon at the World Championships in Athletics has been contested by both men and women since the inaugural edition in 1983. It is the second most prestigious global title in the discipline after the marathon at the Olympics. From 1997 to 2011 it hosted the World Marathon Cup team event. It currently forms part of the World Marathon Majors circuit, which includes the six top annual races. The competition format has separate men's and women's races, which both serve as a straight final. Participation typically numbers between sixty and eighty runners per race. The event usually starts and ends in the main stadium, with the rest of the race taking place on the surrounding roads of the host city.

The championship records for the event are 2:06:54 hours for men, set by Abel Kirui in 2009, and 2:20:57 hours for women, set by Paula Radcliffe in 2005. The world record has never been broken or equalled at the competition by either men or women, reflecting the lack of pacemaking and athletes' more tactical approach to championship races.

Catherine Ndereba and Edna Kiplagat  are the most successful athletes of the event, having each won two gold medals and one silver medal in the women's marathon. In addition, Kiplagat finished top five in five consecutive World Athletics Championship Marathons from 2011-2019. Three other athletes have won the World Championships marathon twice: Abel Antón, Jaouad Gharib, and Abel Kirui – all of whom along with Edna Kiplagat had back-to-back victories.

Kenya is the most successful nation in the discipline, having won eight gold medals overall (four in each division). Japan is the next most successful, with three gold medallists, and shares the highest medal total of fourteen with Kenya. Spain has won three gold medals, while Ethiopia has won ten medals in the men's race (the highest).

Age
Patrick Dupouy of French Polynesia became the oldest male competitor of World Championships history in 2007, at the age of 46 years and 85 days. Under current regulations, the records for the youngest participants will remain indefinitely as any athlete in the junior category (under-20) that year, or younger, is ineligible to enter the marathon.

 Ayele Seteng of Israel was originally stated as the oldest competitor, but this was due to an administrative error on his passport, which lists his date of birth as understood under the Ethiopian calendar (showing some seven to eight years less than the Gregorian calendar).

Doping
The first doping ban to effect the World Championships marathon came in 2001, when Italy's Roberto Barbi (60th in the men's race) was disqualified. Original eighth-placer Nailiya Yulamanova was disqualified from the 2009 women's race and another Russian, Mikhail Lemayev, had his result annulled from the men's race that year. Biological passport irregularities saw Abderrahim Goumri's runs in 2009 and 2011 retrospectively annulled. The anti-doping programme at the 2013 championships saw Jeremías Saloj disqualified from the men's race for doping.

Medalists

Men

Multiple medalists

Medalists by country

Women

Multiple medalists

Medalists by country

Championship record progression

Men

Women

References

Bibliography

External links
Official IAAF website

 
World Championships in Athletics
Events at the World Athletics Championships
World Athletics Championships